The 4th Infantry Regiment was an infantry regiment in the Imperial Japanese Army. The regiment was attached to the 2nd Division. The regiment was raised at Sendai on 14 May 1888. The regiment participated in the Second Sino-Japanese War and The Pacific War.

Organization
1st Battalion
2nd Battalion
3rd Battalion

Infantry Regiments (Imperial Japanese Army)
Military units and formations established in 1871
Military units and formations disestablished in 1945
1945 disestablishments in Japan